Madeleine Dalphond-Guiral (born June 6, 1938) is a Canadian nurse, professor and politician.

Dalphond-Gurial was a registered nurse by training and later a professor of nursing. She was first elected to the House of Commons of Canada as a Bloc Québécois MP for the riding of Laval Centre in the 1993 federal election. She served as Official Opposition Deputy Whip from 1994 to 1996, Chief BQ Whip from 1996 to 1997 and again as Deputy Whip until 2000. She also served in the BQ shadow cabinet as Citizenship and Immigration Critic from 2000 to 2004. She did not run in the 2004 federal election.

Electoral record (partial)

External links
The Politics of Empathy By Darren Boisvert - A Canadian nurse injects her ward experiences into the halls of Parliament.
 

Members of the House of Commons of Canada from Quebec
Bloc Québécois MPs
Women members of the House of Commons of Canada
Women in Quebec politics
1938 births
Living people
Nursing educators
21st-century Canadian politicians
21st-century Canadian women politicians